The 1st Light Cruiser Squadron was a naval unit of the Royal Navy from 1913 to 1924.

History
The 1st Light Cruiser Squadron was a Royal Navy unit of the Grand Fleet during World War I. Four of its ships (Inconstant, Galatea, Cordelia and Phaeton) fought at Jutland in 1916, by which time it was under the command of Commodore Edwyn Alexander-Sinclair – his flagship, Galatea, was the first to sight enemy vessels, at 2:20pm. During the interwar period, the 1st Light Cruiser Squadron was a unit of the Atlantic Fleet until October 1924. In November 1924 the squadron was dispatched to the Mediterranean Fleet where it was re-designated 1st Cruiser Squadron.

Commodores/Rear admirals commanding
Post holders included:

Deployments
Distribution of the squadron included:

References

Sources
 Mackie, Colin, (2010–2014), British Armed Services between 1860 and the present day — Royal Navy – Senior Appointments, http://www.gulabin.com/.

External links

Light Cruiser squadrons of the Royal Navy
Military units and formations of the Royal Navy in World War I
Military units and formations of the Royal Navy in World War II